Holanthias is a genus of colourful marine ray-finned fishes in the subfamily Anthiinae, part of the family Serranidae, the groupers and sea basses. The two species are restricted to fairly deep reefs in the Southeast Atlantic.

Species
In the past this genus included more species, but these have now been moved to other genera; Meganthias, Odontanthias and Pronotogrammus. Based on FishBase, the following two species are currently included in Holanthias:

 Holanthias caudalis Trunov, 1976 – Ascension
 Holanthias fronticinctus (Günther, 1868) (St Helena sea perch) – Saint Helena

References

Anthiinae
Taxa named by Albert Günther